Andres Barrioquinto is a Filipino artist known for his surrealistic portraits that combines elements deriving from the iconography and aesthetic of Baroque with Japanese woodcuts (ukiyo-e), reinterpreted in a Pop style. In his paintings, men, women, and anthropomorphic animals are shown in forests plentiful with butterflies and birds, introducing the theme of vanitas in a context of strong visual impact. He was born on April 6, 1975, in Manila, Philippines,

Early life and education 
Barrioquinto was born in Manila but his family kept on switching residencies due to the nature of his father's job, which was writing and editing. He spent his teenage years in Hong Kong, studying at Royden House School. Then he went back to Manila to get his college education. He went back to Manila and studied Fine Arts major in Painting at the University of Santo Tomas in 2000. Barrioquinto has always found a sense of poetic comfort in music. As a result, his artworks has been strongly influenced by the music of The Smiths, Jeff Buckley, and Soundgarden and even the lesser known ones like The Sound and Nick Drake.

Awards and recognition 
Barrioquinto has received various awards and recognitions such as the MetroBank Foundation’s Aces Award for Continuing Excellence (2009), Cultural Center of the Philippines’ Thirteen Artist’s award in 2003, and a back-to-back recipient of the UST Benavidez Awards in 1999 and 2000. He then had 19 solo exhibitions in the Philippines and 5 in Singapore. Some of his works can be seen in the Singapore Art Museum

In 2018, he showed Portraits, a special exhibition at the National Museum. He is one of only a few living artists to do this, featuring contemporary depictions of today’s most influential faces: Ben Chan, Baby Fores, Josie Natori, and Bea Zobel Jr, to name a few. In that same year, he was included in the roster of PeopleAsia magazine's People of the Year awardees and the year after that.    

In 2021, he was included in Lifestyle Asia's The List

In 2022, Rizzoli New York published a comprehensive monograph on the life and career of the Filipino artist Andres Barrioquinto. It contains essays from renowned art critics and curators Demetrio Paparoni, Patrick Flores, and Ricky Francisco.

Gallery

External links
Official Website of Andres Barrioquinto

https://www.tatlerasia.com/culture/arts/asian-cultural-council-showcases-barrioquintos-portraits

https://lifestyleasia.onemega.com/andres-barrioquinto-on-his-dark-art-somehow-im-always-looking-for-that-feeling-of-struggle/

https://dfa.gov.ph/dfa-news/news-from-our-foreign-service-postsupdate/24396-andres-barrioquinto-exhibits-anew-in-uk

https://lifestyleasia.onemega.com/visual-impact-andres-barrioquinto-is-the-subject-of-an-upcoming-rizzoli-volume/

https://news.abs-cbn.com/ancx/culture/art/10/13/18/the-enlightenment-of-andres-barrioquinto

https://www.philstar.com/lifestyle/sunday-life/2018/10/21/1861707/asian-cultural-council-presents-barrioquinto

https://filipinna.com/2018/12/people-of-the-year-2019-tycoons-titans-thespians-a-tot/

1975 births
Living people
People from Manila
Artists from Metro Manila
Filipino painters
University of Santo Tomas alumni